Teiuşu may refer to several villages in Romania:

 Teiuşu, a village in Isvoarele Commune, Giurgiu County
 Teiuşu, a village in Brebeni Commune, Olt County
 Teiuşu, a village in Buneşti Commune, Vâlcea County

See also
Teiuș